Tumeremo massacre typically refers to the following massacres in Tumeremo, Venezuela:

2016 Tumeremo massacre
October 2018 Tumeremo massacre